Pirate Enlightenment, or the Real Libertalia is a 2023 book by David Graeber.

Description 

In Pirate Enlightenment, or the Real Libertalia, author David Graeber argues that Ratsimilaho of the Zana-Malata Malagasy ethnic group and descendent of a pirate oversaw a period of democracy and peace as a precursor to the Age of Enlightenment. Graeber contests the common portrayal of Ratsimilaho as a European civilizer.

Publication 

The book began as an expansion of a chapter of Graeber's On Kings (2017). Revisiting his early 1990s anthropology dissertation work in Madagascar, Graeber focused on the Zana-Malata and Betsimisaraka ethnic groups. Graeber finished writing the book in 2013.

Allen Lane acquired the book's UK rights via Janklow & Nesbit in September 2022. Its first print run with Farrar Straus & Giroux was 200,000 copies in the United States.

Reception 

Pirate Enlightenment placed on LitHub and The Guardian most anticpated books of 2023. Upon its release, it appeared on the Indie Bestseller list for hardcover nonfiction, based on reporting from independent bookstores in the United States.

References

Bibliography

External links 

 

2023 non-fiction books
English-language books
Anthropology books
Pirate books
Farrar, Straus and Giroux books
History of Madagascar
Books by David Graeber